HMS Coventry was a C-class light cruiser of the Royal Navy, named after the English city of Coventry.  She was part of the Ceres group of the C-class of cruisers.

Early career and wartime service

Coventry was initially going to be called HMS Corsair. She was laid down on 4 August 1916, launched 6 July 1917 and completed for naval service in February 1918.  HMS Coventry was in the 5th Light Cruiser squadron from February 1918 till May 1919, and served in the Baltic in this time. Commissioned with the pennant (D43) in May 1919 she was accepted into the Atlantic fleet, until in 1920 when HMS Coventry became the HQ ship for naval Inter allied Disarmament Commission. She went into refit in late 1920 and once the refit was completed she joined the 2nd Light cruiser squadron and she became flagship to the Rear-Admiral [D], Mediterranean Fleet Andrew Cunningham. A torpedo explosion while in Gibraltar in March 1923 caused the death of two of her crew, Chief Stoker Burt and ERA Jackson.

In 1935, Coventry went into Portsmouth Dockyard to be refitted as an anti-aircraft cruiser. This refit involved the removal of her 6-inch guns and torpedo tubes, and the fitting of 10 QF 4-inch Mk V guns on single high-angle mountings and 2 octuple-mounted 2-pounder 'pom-pom' guns. The after one of these was replaced in 1936/7 by two quadruple Mark I mounts for the 0.5 inch (12.7 mm) Vickers Mark III machine gun. At the outbreak of World War II HMS Coventry was serving with the Home Fleet between 1939 and 1940, and was damaged on 1 January 1940 in a German air attack on the Shetland Islands, north of Scotland.  She was assigned to the Mediterranean fleet in 1940, and was torpedoed and damaged by the Italian submarine Neghelli in the eastern Mediterranean.  Coventry also participated in the Battle of Cape Spartivento.

The Victoria Cross

On 18 May 1941 the first Victoria Cross of the Mediterranean campaign was awarded posthumously to Petty Officer Alfred Edward Sephton for "great courage and endurance" while on HMS Coventry as she was being attacked on 17 May 1941 by German Stuka dive bombers while off Crete. The Coventry had gone to the assistance of hospital ship Aba, which was being attacked by German dive-bombers. When the enemy engaged Coventry, raking her with machine-gun fire, Petty Officer Sephton was mortally wounded, a bullet actually passing through his body and injuring an able seaman beside him. Although in great pain and partially blinded, he stuck to his instruments and carried out his duties until the attack was over. He died of his injuries next day.  Petty Officer Sephton was buried at sea. His VC was on display at Coventry Cathedral but was stolen on 25 September 1990.

Loss

HMS Coventry  was heavily damaged in the Eastern Mediterranean, north-west of Alexandria, Egypt by 16 German Junkers Ju 88s of I./Lehrgeschwader 1 under the command of Joachim Helbig, whilst participating in Operation Agreement. 8./StG 3 also took part in the attack.

References

Bibliography

External links
 A naval art history website.
 Information on the wreck
 List of cruisers of wwi
 IWM Interview with survivor George Woodley

 

C-class cruisers
Ships built on the River Tyne
1917 ships
World War II cruisers of the United Kingdom
Cruisers sunk by aircraft
World War II shipwrecks in the Mediterranean Sea
Maritime incidents in September 1942
Ships built by Swan Hunter
Ships sunk by German aircraft
Scuttled vessels